Jeff McDonald (born 1963 in Hawthorne, California) is an American singer and guitarist best known for being a co-founder of alternative rock band Redd Kross with his younger brother, Steven Shane McDonald. In the early 2000s, he played in Ze Malibu Kids, with his wife, Charlotte Caffey, of The Go-Go's, his brother, and sister-in-law Anna Waronker. In addition to music, McDonald has also acted alongside his brother and David Cassidy in the comedy film The Spirit of '76.

Redd Kross

In 1984, Redd Kross returned with drummer Dave Peterson to record Teen Babes from Monsanto, an album featuring songs originally by such artists as Kiss, David Bowie, The Rolling Stones, and The Shangri-Las.

In 1984, lead guitarist Robert Hecker joined the band, as Redd Kross embarked on tour in support of Teen Babes from Monsanto.

In that same year, they were featured on the soundtrack of Desperate Teenage Lovedolls with their cover of the Brady Bunch Kids''' "It's a Sunshine Day". Jeff and Steve appear in the movie, along with Robert in the sequel Lovedolls Superstar which the brothers co-wrote with Dave Markey and Jennifer Schwartz. Both movies are available now on DVD.

In 1985, drummer Roy McDonald (of The Muffs and formerly of The Things, and no relation to the brothers) joined the band.

In 1987, Redd Kross released Neurotica, an album reportedly influenced by Saturday morning cartoons and breakfast cereal (one of the songs was called "Frosted Flake"). Although the album itself was successful, the band's label, Big Time Records folded. The band continued to tour during these years however, and in 1988, drummer Victor Indrizzo joined the band.

Tater Totz

As The Tater Totz, the McDonald's teamed with Pat Fear of White Flag and Michael Quercio from The Three O'Clock and released Alien Sleestaks from Brazil, the title a tribute to the series Land of the Lost. Another cover collection, it included songs originally by Queen and Yoko Ono, and featured a cover of The Beatles' "I've Just Seen a Face" with lead vocals by guest Danny Bonaduce. The second Tater Totz album, in 1989, included Cherie Currie of The Runaways, and Pat Smear. A third Tater Totz album was released called Tater Comes Alive. A side project, Anarchy 6, had two releases, Hardcore Lives! and a cassette only album Live Like a Suicidal, and was featured in Lovedolls Superstar.

1990s

On 20 February 1990, Redd Kross appeared on Episode 2 of the cult Public-access television show "Decoupage"  with Summer Caprice.

In 1990, Redd Kross signed with Atlantic Records, releasing Third Eye, and appeared with David Cassidy in the film Spirit of '76, and issued several singles, including "Annie's Gone", which had some mild success on college radio. Former Red Hot Chili Peppers / future Pearl Jam drummer Jack Irons joined for the Third Eye tours, and appears in the promotional video for "Annie's Gone", which saw some light rotation on MTV. Brian Reitzell succeeded Irons as drummer in the band, and appears in the promotional video for "1976".

In 1991, Robert Hecker took leave from the band.

The album Phaseshifter was released in 1993, with new band members Eddie Kurdziel, Gere Fennelly, and Brian Reitzell. The videos for "Jimmy's Fantasy" and "Lady in the Front Row" were both shown on MTV's 120 Minutes. They toured on Phaseshifter for over a year, headling their own shows as well as tours supporting The Lemonheads and The Spin Doctors in late 1993 and Stone Temple Pilots in 1994. In 1995, Jeff and his wife, Charlotte Caffey (from The Go-Go's), had a daughter, named Astrid.

In 1997, Redd Kross released Show World, produced by Chris Shaw and toured supporting The Presidents of the United States of America.  The band took an indefinite hiatus after the Show World tour, and their future was uncertain after the untimely death of guitarist Eddie Kurdziel on 6 June 1999.

Current

On 1 July 2006, Redd Kross returned to the live stage after almost a decade's absence. The Neurotica-era line up of Jeff McDonald, Steven McDonald, Robert Hecker and Roy McDonald performed a career-spanning set at the REDCAT (Roy and Edna Disney/Cal Arts Theater) at Disney Hall in Los Angeles. The band has subsequently gone on to play at the Azkena Festival in Spain, the Detour Festival in Los Angeles, give a performance of their entire first EP in honor of Rodney Bingenheimer's being awarded a star on Hollywood Boulevard, and a set consisting of the entire Born Innocent album opening for Sonic Youth (who performed Daydream Nation) at the Greek Theater in Los Angeles. They toured Spain and England in January, 2007. They have played a number of one-off shows including Los Angeles, New York, Chicago, and San Francisco. In 2008 they played the Coachella Festival in Coachella, California; ATP vs Pitchfork festival in Sussex, England; and NXNE Festival in Toronto, Ontario. In 2010, Redd Kross headlined the Turbo Rock Festival in Spain. In 2011, they headlined the POP Montreal Festival.

Redd Kross toured Australia as part of the Hoodoo Gurus' 30th Anniversary on the "Dig It Up" Festival concert series. Jason Shapiro of the band Celebrity Skin played guitar, sitting in for Robert Hecker on these dates.

Their new album, Researching the Blues was released on Merge Records on 7 August 2012. They are also putting out a split and performing with the Melvins on 31 December 2012 on Amphetamine Reptile Records.

The band return to Australia in March 2013, touring with Dinosaur Jr.

Side projects
The McDonald brothers collaborated with Charlotte Caffey and Anna Waronker (Steve's wife, frontwoman of That Dog) on a side project. Performing as Ze Malibu Kids, they released the album Sound It Out in 2002.

Soundtracks
Redd Kross songs appear on various on the soundtracks to Good Burger, PCU, Bordello of Blood, An American Werewolf in Paris, and Varsity Blues. They have done one song "it is a Scream" for the 2000 film Shriek If You Know What I Did Last Friday The Thirteenth but no soundtrack or the song was ever released on CD.

Discography / videography

Solo Albums
 The Outrageous Incantations Of Beatrice Winters (2009)
 Jeff McDonald (2016)

Redd Kross Albums
 Born Innocent (1982)
 Teen Babes From Monsanto (1984)
 Neurotica (1987)
 Third Eye (1990)
 Phaseshifter (1993)
 Show World (1997)
 Researching the Blues (2012)
 Beyond the Door (2019)

Redd Kross EPs
 Red Cross (1980)
 2500 Redd Kross Fans Can't Be Wrong (1993)

Redd Kross DVDs
 Got LIVE if you must (2008)
 A History Lesson Part 1 (2010)

Redd Kross Singles

Redd Kross Compilation appearances
 The Siren (1980)
 Includes "I Hate My School" and "Standing in Front of Poseur"
 Hell Comes to Your House (1981)
 Includes "Puss 'n' Boots"
 American Youth Report (1982)
 Includes "Notes and Chords Mean Nothing to Me"
 Enigma Variations (1985)
 Includes "Citadel"
 Shared Vision – The Songs of the Beatles (1993)
 Band covers Beatles song "It Won't Be Long"
 If I Were a Carpenter (1994)
 Redd Kross performs a cover of "Yesterday Once More"
 Poptopia! Power Pop Classics of the '90s (1997)
 Includes "Lady in the Front Row"
 KISS Tribute in Japan'' (1998)
 With Kanako Nakayama, Redd Kross performs a cover of "Hard Luck Woman"

References

External links
Redd Kross official website
The Bubblegum Factory: Redd Kross Fan Page with bio, press info, gig posters, photos and complete discography.

Atlantic Records artists
Musicians from Hawthorne, California
1963 births
American rock guitarists
American male guitarists
American rock singers
Living people
Redd Kross members
Guitarists from California
20th-century American guitarists
20th-century American male musicians